Eva Kuhlefelt-Ekelund (5 September 1892, in Loviisa, Finland – 7 August 1984, in Helsinki, Finland) was a pioneering Finnish woman architect and spouse of another famous Finnish architect Hilding Ekelund.

Eva Kuhlefelt-Ekelund matriculated from the Helsinki New Swedish secondary school in 1910. After that she studied in Helsinki University of Technology and graduated as an architect in 1916. Later she also received state grant and studied in Stockholm, Sweden between 1919 and 1921. She made study trips to Scandinavian countries as well as to Italy and France. Kuhlefelt-Ekelund also collaborated with another architect Elsi Borg  and mapped and documented with her Swedish manors and castles.
In year 1920 Eva Kuhlefelt married architect Hilding Ekelund and established her two part surname Kuhlefelt-Ekelund. The couple also founded their own architect office in Helsinki in 1927.

Some well-known designs
Eva Kuhlefelt-Ekelund designed Privata svenska flickskolan (Private Swedish girls' school) in Apollonkatu in Helsinki which completed in 1929. The building represented Nordic Classicism.
She also designed monumental Loviisa war cemetery in 1920 and old people's homes to Loviisa and Käpylä, Helsinki.

References

External links
Museum of Finnish Architecture: Eva Kuhlefelt-Ekelund

1892 births
1984 deaths
20th-century Finnish architects
People from Loviisa
People from Uusimaa Province (Grand Duchy of Finland)
Swedish-speaking Finns
Finnish women architects